La Isabela International Airport  opened in 23 February 2006 to replace Herrera International Airport. The first flight to land at the airport was a Caribair flight from Port-au-Prince, Haiti.

It primarily serves the Dominican Republic with domestic flights and some international flights to other Caribbean islands. La Isabela Airport is the major hub for Dominican airlines that operate small aircraft. The airport has the largest number of hangars in the country (+40) for Dominican-based carriers. It is, as of June 2020, also the only airport in Santo Domingo that serves domestic destinations, as Las Americas International Airport, the other airport serving  Santo Domingo, lacks domestic air service.

Airlines and destinations

Statistics

Other facilities
The airport hosts the corporate headquarters of Servicios Aéreos Profesionales (SAP Group) and Air Century.

References

Airports in the Dominican Republic
Buildings and structures in Santo Domingo Province
Airports established in 2006
2006 establishments in the Dominican Republic